Darkside is the second studio album by Swedish blackened death metal band Necrophobic. It was released in 1997. There is a hidden track after the tenth track.

Track listing

References

External links
Official website

1997 albums
Necrophobic albums